Monique Olivier (born 13 May 1998 in South Africa) is a national record-holding swimmer from Luxembourg. She attends the International School of Luxembourg in Luxembourg City and has swum for Luxembourg at several international competitions, including the 2013 Games of the Small States of Europe, 2014 FINA World Swimming Championships (25 m), and 2014 Summer Youth Olympics.

As of March 2019, she holds Luxembourg records in long course (50m) 200m,400m 800m and 1500 freestyle, 200m and 400 m individual medley and 200 butterfly , 4x100 and 4x200 freestyle relay, as well as short course (25m)200m,400m,800m and 1500 freestyle, 200m and 400m individual medley and 200m butterfly

References 

1998 births
Luxembourgian female swimmers
Swimmers at the 2014 Summer Youth Olympics
Living people
Sportspeople from Gauteng
Luxembourgian female freestyle swimmers
Female butterfly swimmers